The Hyundai Universe (hangul:현대 유니버스) is a heavy-duty luxury coach manufactured by the truck & bus division of Hyundai. Introduced in December 2006, it is primarily available as luxury hi-classic tourist buses. It is related to its sibling, the second generation Kia Granbird since 2007.

It is distinguishable by a front 'Universe' badge by Hyundai's global standard luxury coach, but the common Hyundai badge is luxurious bus design usually used on the rear.

Its principal competitor is the Daewoo FX series, and BX212M.

Design

Introduced as the successor to the Hyundai Aero, the new model was developed in a period of 3 years under the project codename: PY.

Unlike its predecessor, the Universe has been developed with Hyundai's proprietary technology and was fitted with a monocoque body to enhance structural rigidity and provides lightweight body construction. This contributes to a reduction in vibration and better roll over protection. Furthermore, disc-brake equipped versions would also benefit from the Electronic Stability Program including ABS and ASR. The Universe also features modern dynamic styling, sporting a sleek aerodynamic look, accentuated by optional spoilers. Driving ergonomics were also improved as well as greater durability to extend service life.

Superior power and performance is delivered by Hyundai's 235-340 hp Q-engines coupled with 5-speed manual gearbox. A cleaner and economical Euro-III compliant engine is also offered; the new electronically controlled Powertec D6CB engine capable of 410 hp is fitted with a 6-speed ZF6S1600 automated gearbox as a standard, but also available is a 380 hp version with 5-speed manual gearbox. In 2008, Euro-IV compliant engines were added up to the range following the development of the new D6HA and Powertec D6CC engines, with outputs ranging from 380 to 425 hp. Carbon footprint conscious operators could also opt in for alternative fuel engine such as the CNG powered Q-engine with 340 hp.

The model lineup includes “Classic” and “Luxury” trim levels in the standard deck “Space” variant, while the “Noble” trim level in the high deck “Xpress” variant stands at the top of the range. Additional trim levels for Korean domestic models includes “Comfort” and “Elegance” for the Space variant as well as “Prime” and “Noble Queen” for the Xpress variant. The “Limousine” trim level introduced for VIP class is the ultimate in luxury and comfort. The difference between each trim levels lies primarily on the features adapted per application such as aesthetics, engine power output, suspension type, passenger capacity, and interior configuration. The Universe is also offered in right-hand drive orientation and can also be equipped with an on-board restroom, wheel chair lift, or an emergency door.

Models

The Universe was designed by Hyundai Motor Company Jeonju Design Center. It was based on a rebadged Hyundai Bus Chassis. The variants include:
Space
Comfort: successor to Aero Space LD
Classic
Elegance: successor to Aero Space LS
Luxury
Xpress
Prime: successor to Aero Hi-Space 
Prime EX (2019-present)
Noble
Noble Queen: successor to Aero Queen Hi-Class
Noble EX (2019-present)
Prestige

Refresh
Unveiled on 22 January 2019, the refreshed Hyundai Universe is the first coach model remained to use Hyundai's commercial vehicle chassis, that also shared with the basis of the refreshed Kia Granbird from 2020. It also comes with Blue Link connected services. It features a restyled grille instead of Hyundai's cascading grille, restyled headlamps with I-shaped LED tech, and restyled tail lamps with also an LED. The interior also features a restyled entertainment system, and the dashboard retains a large color instrument cluster, and a large touchscreen infotainment system.

The powertrain of the refreshed coach is a Powertech 12.7-liter diesel engine paired to both manual and automatic transmissions.

See also

Hyundai Motor Company
Hyundai Aero City
Hyundai RB
Hyundai Aero

External links
Hyundai Universe Launching Show
Hyundai Universe Images
 UNIVERSE e-CATALOG
 

Buses of South Korea
Coaches (bus)
Rear-wheel-drive vehicles
Single-deck buses
Hyundai buses
Vehicles introduced in 2006